Jonathan Isaac Pedley (born 1962) is a British authority on wine. He was born in Wednesfield, Wolverhampton, England. As a child he attended the Royal Wolverhampton School where he was Head Boy in the academic year 1979–80. He was the only son and first of three children born to Isaac Pedley (1920-1971) and Dorothy Pedley (1926-2017).

Pedley went on to read biochemistry at Oxford before taking a job with Grants of St James's. He helped re-establish the School of Wine and became a Master of Wine in 1992.

His other notable activities include TV and video productions with Keith Floyd, lecturing at Edith Cowan University and acting as a wine consultant to Carlsberg-Tetley.

References

Further reading
Floyd Uncorked, by Keith Floyd and Jonathan Pedley, HarperCollins Publishers 1998

1962 births
Living people
Masters of Wine
People from Wolverhampton
People educated at the Royal Wolverhampton School